Carlos Adolphus Waite (born in Plattsburgh, New York 5 May 1797; died in Plattsburgh, New York, 7 May 1866) was a career soldier in the United States Army who, in his retirement, received the brevet rank of Brigadier General.

Biography
Carlos A. Waite entered the U.S. Army as 3d lieutenant of infantry, 28 January 1820, became 1st lieutenant, 1 May 1828, and captain, 3 July 1836. From 7 July 1838 until 8 May 1845, he was captain and assistant quartermaster. He was appointed major of the 8th U.S. Infantry, 16 February 1847, and served in the Mexican–American War, receiving the brevets of lieutenant colonel, 20 August 1847, for gallant and meritorious conduct at Contreras and Churubusco, and colonel, 8 September 1847, for gallant and meritorious conduct at Molino del Rey, where he was severely wounded. He was made lieutenant colonel of the 5th U.S. Infantry on 10 November 1851, and colonel of the 1st U.S. Infantry on 5 June 1860. On 19 February 1861, Waite superseded Brevet Major General David E. Twiggs as commander of the Department of Texas as Twiggs surrendered the department to the Confederates in the beginning of what would become the American Civil War (Twiggs would eventually be commissioned into the Confederate States Army). Waite commanded the department until it was officially abolished later in 1861. After returning east he commanded the military post at Annapolis, Maryland. In 1864 he was placed on the retired list, owing to impaired health, and he resided in Plattsburgh until his death. After the war he was brevetted Brigadier General, backdated to 13 March 1865, for long and faithful service in the U.S. Army; however the confirmation wasn't issued before his death.

See also
List of American Civil War brevet generals (Union)

Notes

References
 https://tshaonline.org/handbook/online/articles/fwa12

1797 births
1866 deaths
Union Army colonels
United States Army colonels
American military personnel of the Mexican–American War
People of New York (state) in the American Civil War